Juan Mera may refer to-

 Juan León Mera, Ecuadorian essayist, novelist, politician and painter
 Juan Mera González, Spanish footballer